Zow-e Bala (also Romanized as Zow-e Bālā) is a village in Hezarmasjed Rural District, in the Central District of Kalat County, Razavi Khorasan Province, Iran. At the 2006 census, its population was 10, in 4 families.

References 

Populated places in Kalat County